Great Western railway station is the 61st railway station on the Main Line (which runs between Colombo and Badulla), and is  away from Colombo.

This railway station lies between the Watagoda and Radella railway stations. The station has two platforms with a second track as a siding loop. All the trains that run on the Main Line, including the Podi Menike and Udarata Menike express trains stop at the station.

The railway station was constructed to service the Great Western Estate, a  tea plantation in the foothills of the Great Western Mountain. The estate was originally established by J. A. Rossiter in 1866. In 1883 the estate was predominately a coffee plantation owned and operated by Dent Brothers & Co. In 1893 following the construction of the railway station the ownership of the estate was transferred to the Great Western Tea Company of Ceyon, Ltd.

Continuity

See also
 List of railway stations in Sri Lanka
 List of railway stations by line order in Sri Lanka

References

Railway stations in Nuwara Eliya District
Railway stations on the Main Line (Sri Lanka)
Railway stations opened in 1893